Re Goldcorp Exchange Ltd [1994] UKPC 3 is an English trusts law case by the Judicial Committee of the Privy Council decision on appeal from the Court of Appeal of New Zealand. It considers when there is sufficient certainty of subject matter to form a trust, and tracing. A company dealing in gold and other precious metals became insolvent and the Bank of New Zealand appointed receivers under a debenture. They in turn asked the High Court for guidance on how to treat the company's customers, and Thorp J refused the claims of most of the customers, leaving three categories to be settled on appeal. The outstanding issue was whether the customers had title to the gold on for them, and thus beneficiaries of a trust, or were merely unsecured creditors resulting from a breach of contract.

Facts
Goldcorp Exchange Ltd had a business of holding gold reserves in coins and ingots for customers wishing to invest in gold. Some gold was held for customers, but the levels varied from time to time. The company's employees also told customers that the company would maintain a separate and sufficient stock of each type of bullion to meet their demands, but in fact it did not. The Bank of New Zealand on 11 July 1988, being owed money by Goldcorp Exchange Ltd, petitioned for the business to be wound up. It transpired that Goldcorp had not held anywhere near enough money for the members of the public, around 1000 people, who had supposedly bought gold with it, even though in their contracts they were entitled to delivery of the gold (in 7 days, for a fee) if they wished. The company also lacked enough assets to satisfy the debts to the bank. The members of the public alleged that the gold that remained in stock was entrusted to them. The bank argued that it did not, because the gold stocks had never been isolated; and that all the gold customers were unsecured creditors and that the bank's security interest (a floating charge) took priority. Jonathan Sumption QC represented the bank.

Advice
The Privy Council advised that the customers had no property interest in the gold, and therefore the bank could use it to satisfy its debts. The customers' purchase contracts did not transfer title, because which gold specifically was to be sold was not yet certain. Although Goldcorp's brochures had promised title, a trust did not arise because there was no declaration of it. There was not enough gold to satisfy the claims, even though it was promised that the gold would be set aside. It was contrary to policy to imply a fiduciary duty simply because there was a breach of contract. It was also rejected that equity required any restitution of the purchase money.

Lord Mustill gave the advice of the Board.

Lord Templeman, Lord Lloyd and Sir Thomas Eichelbaum agreed.

Significance
The outcome of the advice of the Board was not mirrored by the Supreme Court in In re Lehman Brothers International (Europe), which concerned consumers who were held to have had a trust of assets under the Markets in Financial Instruments Directive that was designed to protect their savings.

See also

English trusts law
UK commercial law

Notes

References

English trusts case law
1994 in New Zealand law
1994 in case law
Judicial Committee of the Privy Council cases on appeal from New Zealand